Sály is a village in Borsod-Abaúj-Zemplén County in northeastern Hungary

References

Populated places in Borsod-Abaúj-Zemplén County